A lapidarium is a place where stone monuments and fragments of archaeological interest are exhibited. 

Lapidiarium may also refer to:
 Lapidarium (Aceves), a sculpture exhibition by Gustavo Aceves
 Lapidarium, Kerch
 Lapidarium, Prague

See also 
 Lapidary (disambiguation)